Greatest Moments is a greatest hits compilation by British band Culture Club. It was released in the UK on 9 November 1998, where it reached No. 15 in the UK Albums Chart and was certified platinum.

Content
The album includes songs released by the band, spanning from their debut album (1982's Kissing to Be Clever), to their most recent single "I Just Wanna Be Loved", which reached No. 4 in the UK Singles Chart in 1998. It also features three solo Boy George tracks.

A limited edition bonus disc titled VH1 Storytellers Live, featured Culture Club performing selected songs live in front of a small audience on 2 May 1998 at Sony Studios in New York City, for the VH1 network's Storytellers television music series. It features the first release of the song "Strange Voodoo" (released in a studio version on their 1999 album Don't Mind If I Do and the only release of the reggae track "What Do You Want".

Track listing

Greatest Moments (disc 1)
 "Do You Really Want to Hurt Me"
 "Time (Clock of the Heart)"
 "Church of the Poison Mind"
 "Karma Chameleon"
 "Victims"
 "I'll Tumble 4 Ya"
 "It's a Miracle"
 "Miss Me Blind"
 "Move Away"
 "Love is Love"
 "Everything I Own" (Boy George solo track)
 "The Crying Game" (Boy George solo track)
 "I Just Wanna Be Loved"
 "Generations of Love (The Timewriter Bootleg Mix)" (Boy George solo track) (UK edition only)

VH1 Storytellers Live (disc 2)
 "Church of the Poison Mind"
 "Miss Me Blind"
 "Move Away"
 "I'll Tumble 4 Ya"
 "It's a Miracle"
 "That's the Way (I'm Only Trying to Help You)"
 "Strange Voodoo"
 "Black Money" (US/Canada editions only)
 "I Just Wanna Be Loved"
 "What Do You Want"
 "The Crying Game"
 "Victims"
 "Do You Really Want to Hurt Me"
 "Time (Clock of the Heart)"
 "Karma Chameleon"

Charts

Culture Club albums
1998 live albums
1998 greatest hits albums
Virgin Records compilation albums
Virgin Records live albums
VH1 Storytellers